The Hatchard Football League was an English association football league based in Sheffield, South Yorkshire.

History
Founded in 1892, it was originally called the Sheffield & District Alliance, only changing name to the Hatchard Cup League halfway through the 1893–94 season when a local politician called Frank Hatchard donated a trophy to the Sheffield & Hallamshire FA.

For many years there were numerous divisions, with the top sides from each section proceeding to end of season play-offs that would determine the overall winner. The league was suspended for the duration of the First World War, then disbanded altogether in 1923, but was re-introduced after the Second World War.

In 1983 the league merged with the Sheffield Association League to form the Sheffield & Hallamshire County Senior League, which (as of 2015) forms a part of the English football league system.

Champions

References

 
Sports leagues established in 1894
Football in South Yorkshire
Defunct football leagues in England
Defunct football competitions in South Yorkshire